Solomon Nissim Algazi (1610c. 1683) was rabbi in Smyrna and in Jerusalem in the 17th century. He was a prolific writer on all topics of rabbinical literature, and won distinction by his treatment of Talmudic hermeneutics and methodology.

His attempts to rationalize Talmudic aggadot, while not scientific in a modern sense, still prove him to have been superior to the average Talmudist of his age. His best work is his Talmudic methodology, Yabin Shemu'ah (He Will Elucidate the Message), which is written in the form of a commentary to Yeshu'ah Ha-Levi's Halikot 'Olam (Venice, 1639; Leghorn, 1792). He wrote two other works on Talmudic methodology; namely, Halikot Eli (The Ways of My God; Smyrna, 1663), and Gufe Halakot (Principles of Halakah; Smyrna, 1675). Algazi was also the author of:
 Ahabat 'Olam (Everlasting Love), a series of homilies (Constantinople, 1642; Dyhernfurth, 1693)
 Hamon Rabbah (The Great Multitude), an index of the Biblical passages quoted in Midrash Rabbah (Constantinople, 1644)
Zehab Sebah (The Gold of the Hoary Head), on Talmudic Haggadot, (Constantinople, 1683)
Leḥem Setarim (Secret Bread), Talmudic novellæ (Venice, 1664)
Me'ullefet Sappirim (Overlaid with Sapphires), selections from the Zohar (Smyrna, 1665; Amsterdam, 1703)
Raẓuf Ahabah (Inlaid with Love), or Apirion Shelomoh (Solomon's Palanquin), notes on the Tosafot to the haggadic passages in the Talmud (Smyrna, 1659; Amsterdam, 1710)
Ta'awah la-'Enayim (A Delight to the Eyes), notes on the Talmudic Haggadot (Salonica, 1655; Sulzbach, 1687)
Shema Shlomo (Hear Solomon) (Smyrna, 1659; Amsterdam 1710)

References

 Its bibliography:
 Azulai, Shem ha-Gedolim, p. 82
 Steinschneider, Moritz, Catalogus Librorum Hebræorum in Bibliotheca Bodleiana, col. 2277
 Fürst, Julius, Bibliotheca Judaica, i. 37, 38.

17th-century rabbis from the Ottoman Empire
Sephardi rabbis in Ottoman Palestine
Smyrniote Jews
1610 births
1683 deaths